David Barratt is a British music composer and record producer. Born in London, England, Barratt worked in New York City and composed music for TV and radio commercials for, amongst others, Michelin, BMW, Coke, LA Gear, Dr Pepper, Revlon, Verizon, Sony, Kodak, 7Up, Pepsi/Star Wars, USA Today, Bridgestone, Hasbro, and H&M.

He is the producer of the Beatles Complete On Ukulele where he will be re-recording the complete works of the Beatles (185 songs), rearranging the songs in styles ranging from hip-hop to country to heavy metal. Each arrangement includes a ukulele.

Artists including Samantha Fox, Wang Chung and Victor Spinetti have appeared on the project which began in January 2009 and is set to complete in July 2012.

As a producer and songwriter, Barratt has worked with Robert Plant, David Bowie, Ginuwine, Family Stand, Roma! and Jeffrey Osborne. He secured two gold records and one platinum record for his song "Heaven Knows" on Now and Zen.

Movies his music has been featured in include - Two Girls and a Guy, Forces of Nature, Dog Run, Pretty Woman, Bedazzled and Sister Act. He has written TV music for the Sci Fi Channel, ITV (UK) and HBO.

Under the name Yellow Note David Barratt has recorded two albums for Liquid Sky Music, the critically acclaimed We're Not The Beatles and Yellow Note Vs. The Daleks and We Love Everybody... You're Next!!!  as well as numerous tracks on 12"s and compilations. In 2001 he released a dub album with Papa Dee on Unitone Recordings, Dubchek Down Memory Gap Lane In 2007, Dubchek released a second album, The Far East End

He has had environmental works performed in New York City and London. His audio sculpture, Karito, was installed in the United Nations General Assembly in New York City in October 2008. Karito is an audio sculpture made from the national anthems of the member states of the UN layered upon one another, projected simultaneously from multiple sound sources.  The exhibition was sponsored by Louis XIII de Remy Martin.

Barratt spent two years living in  Bangkok where he began his Hungry Ghosts series - manipulated photographs printed on canvas describing the dance between the ancient and the present. He has continued working on several other visual projects.

References

External links
 Official site
 Medicino
 Karito
 

Living people
Year of birth missing (living people)
English male composers
English record producers
English songwriters
Musicians from London
British male songwriters